Wright Settlement Cemetery is a historic cemetery located at Wright Settlement in Oneida County, New York.  It was established about 1806, and includes about 3,000 gravestones.  They range from simple, uncut, uninscribed stones to large, ornate family plots.  The cemetery chapel was built about 1870, and is a 1 1/2-story, frame building on a cobblestone foundation.  Also on the property is a contributing carriage house built about 1870.

It was listed on the National Register of Historic Places in 2012.

References

External links
 

Cemeteries on the National Register of Historic Places in New York (state)
1806 establishments in New York (state)
Buildings and structures in Oneida County, New York
National Register of Historic Places in Oneida County, New York